Normand is the French name for the Norman language and people from Normandy.

It is also a surname and masculine given name. Normand is a typically French-canadian given name, never used in european french-speaking countries. It may refer to:

Given name
 Normand Aubin (born 1960), Canadian hockey player
 Normand Baker (1908–1955), Australian artist
 Normand Baron (born 1957), Canadian hockey player
 Normand Brathwaite (born 1958), Canadian comedian, actor, radio and television host, and musician
 Normand Corbeil (1956–2013), Canadian film, television, and video game composer
 Normand D'Amour (born 1962), Canadian actor
 Normand Duguay (born 1941), Canadian politician
 Norm Dupont (born 1957), Canadian hockey player
 Normand Jutras (born 1948), Canadian lawyer and politician
 Normand Lacombe (born 1964), Canadian hockey player
 Norm LaPointe (born 1955), Canadian hockey goaltender
 Normand Lapointe (born 1939), Canadian politician
 Normand Laprise (born 1961), Canadian chef and author
 Normand Lester (born 1945), Canadian investigative journalist
 Normand Léveillé (born 1963), Canadian hockey player
 Normand Lockwood (1906–2002), American composer
 Normand MacLaurin (1835–1914), Scottish-born physician, company director, Australian politician, and university administrator
 Normand Smith Patton (1852–1915), American architect
 Normand Poirier (1928–1981), American journalist, essayist, and newspaper editor
 Normand Rochefort (born 1961), Canadian hockey player
 Normand Roger (born 1949), Canadian composer, sound editor, and sound designer
 Normand Shay (1899–1968), Canadian hockey player
 Normand Toupin (born 1933), Canadian politician

Surname
 Charles Normand (1889–1982), Scottish meteorologist
 Ernest Normand (1859–1923), English painter
 Gilbert Normand (born 1943), Canadian physician and politician
 Jacques Normand (1848–1931), French poet, playwright, and writer
 Jean Normand (1927–2020), British paediatrician, known professionally as Jean Smellie
 Kirstin Normand (born 1974), Canadian synchronized swimmer
 Louis-Philippe Normand (1863–1928), Canadian physician and politician
 Mabel Normand (1892–1930), American silent film actor, screenwriter, director, and producer
 Sharon-Lise Normand, Canadian biostatistician
 Signe Normand (born 1979), Danish biologist and educator
 Télesphore-Eusèbe Normand (1832–1918), Canadian politician
 Wilfrid Normand, Baron Normand (1884–1962), Scottish politician and judge

See also
 Le Normand-class frigate, a French Navy class from the 1950s on
 Franck Le Normand (born 1931), French cyclist in the 1952 Olympics
Stephen Normand (born 1948),
Great-Nephew of Mabel Normand ~ Archivist The Mabel Normand Family Estate from August 1969
 Norman (disambiguation)

Masculine given names